ŽVPL is Slovenia's oldest independent webzine, and was first published on May 18, 1998. It all started out on a drinking crusade which lasted for 42 days, when the editor-in-chief Davorin Pavlica and his friend / programmer Luka Ferlan realized that Slovenia does not have a proper entertainment webzine. They swapped beer for a keyboard, and in only one week, they published a webzine called ŽVPL.

ŽVPL is an acronym for "Party guide to Ljubljana" in Slovenian, and was inspired by Douglas Adams' novel The Hitchhiker's Guide to the Galaxy - the name for the webzine, not the webzine itself. It announces and reviews events, parties, concerts for all Slovenia; you can find domestic and international music news, movie reviews, and much more.

List of ŽVPL's editors
The editors include:
 Luka Ferlan (editor-in-chief, 1998–1999)
 Davorin Pavlica (editor, 1998–1999; editor-in-chief, 1999–2013)
 Gregor Zalaznik (editor, 1999–2013)
 Mare Vavpotič (editor of photography, 1999–2013)
 Alja Kink (2013–present)

List of ŽVPL's founders
The founders are Luka Ferlan, Martin Modic and Davorin Pavlica.

References

External links
 ŽVPL

Magazines established in 1998
Slovenian entertainment websites
Mass media in Ljubljana
1998 establishments in Slovenia
Entertainment magazines